Andrew T. Park was the Allegheny County District Attorney from April 23, 1930  until December 1941-January 1942.

See also

 District Attorney
 Pittsburgh Police
 Allegheny County Sheriff
 Allegheny County Police Department

Lawyers from Pittsburgh
County district attorneys in Pennsylvania